The 2012 Peugeot Tennis Cup was a professional tennis tournament played on clay courts. It was the first edition of the tournament which was part of the 2012 ATP Challenger Tour. It took place in Rio de Janeiro, Brazil between 15 and 21 October 2012.

Singles main draw entrants

Seeds

 1 Rankings are as of October 8, 2012.

Other entrants
The following players received wildcards into the singles main draw:
  Fabiano de Paula
  Ricardo Hocevar
  Tiago Lopes
  Thiago Monteiro

The following players received entry from the qualifying draw:
  Juan Sebastián Cabal
  Marko Djokovic
  André Ghem
  José Pereira

Champions

Singles

 Gastão Elias def.  Boris Pašanski, 6–3, 7–5

Doubles

 Marcelo Demoliner /  João Souza def.  Frederico Gil /  Pedro Sousa, 6–2, 6–4

External links
Official Website

Peugeot Tennis Cup
Peugeot Tennis Cup
2012 in Brazilian tennis